The men's sabre was one of eight fencing events on the fencing at the 1988 Summer Olympics programme. It was the twenty-first appearance of the event. The competition was held from 22 to 23 September 1988. 40 fencers from 18 nations competed. Nations had been limited to three fencers each since 1928. The event was won by defending champion Jean-François Lamour of France, the fourth man to successfully defend an Olympic title in the sabre and the 11th man overall to win multiple medals in the event. It was France's third victory in the event, matching the Soviet Union for second-most all-time (behind Hungary at 11 gold medals). Janusz Olech took silver, Poland's first medal in the event since 1968. Italian Giovanni Scalzo earned bronze.

Background

This was the 21st appearance of the event, which is the only fencing event to have been held at every Summer Olympics. 

Six of the quarterfinalists from 1984 returned: gold medalist Jean-François Lamour of France, silver medalist Marco Marin of Italy, bronze medalist Peter Westbrook of the United States, and quarterfinal losers Pierre Guichot of France, Giovanni Scalzo of Italy, and Ioan Pop of Romania. Lamour's 1984 gold was discounted due to the Soviet-led boycott keeping out dominant powers Hungary and the Soviet Union, but Lamour had won the 1987 world championship with the Hungarians and Soviets competing; he was a serious contender to repeat. 

The other two inter-Games world championships had been won by György Nébald of Hungary (1985) and Sergey Mindirgasov of the Soviet Union (1986). Also returning to Olympic competition after the boycott were 1980 bronze medalist Imre Gedővári of Hungary and finalists Vasil Etropolski and Khristo Etropolski, twins from Bulgaria.

Bolivia, Chinese Taipei, the Philippines, and South Korea each made their debut in the men's sabre. Italy made its 19th appearance in the event, most of any nation, having missed the inaugural 1896 event and the 1904 St. Louis Games.

Competition format

The 1988 tournament used a three-phase format very similar to that of 1984. Unlike the foil and épée competitions, the sabre tournament kept the size of the second phase (double elimination) round at 16 fencers (compared to expanding to 32 for foil and épée).

The first phase was a multi-round round-robin pool play format; each fencer in a pool faced each other fencer in that pool once. There were three pool rounds: 
 The first round had 6 pools of 6 or 7 fencers each, with the top 5 in each pool advancing.
 The second round had 6 pools of 5 fencers each, with the top 4 in each pool advancing.
 The third round had 4 pools of 6 fencers each, with the top 4 in each pool advancing.

The second phase was a truncated double-elimination tournament. Four fencers advanced to the final round through the winners brackets and four more advanced via the repechage.

The final phase was a single elimination tournament with a bronze medal match.

Bouts in the round-robin pools were to 5 touches; bouts in the double-elimination and final rounds were to 10 touches.

Schedule

All times are Korea Standard Time adjusted for daylight savings (UTC+10)

Results

Round 1

Round 1 Pool A

Round 1 Pool B

Round 1 Pool C

Round 1 Pool D

Round 1 Pool E

Round 1 Pool F

Round 2

Round 2 Pool A

Round 2 Pool B

Round 2 Pool C

Round 2 Pool D

Round 2 Pool E

Round 2 Pool F

Round 3

Round 3 Pool A

Round 3 Pool B

Round 3 Pool C

Round 3 Pool D

Double elimination rounds

Winners brackets

Winners group 1

Winners group 2

Winners group 3

Winners group 4

Repechages

Repechage 1

Repechage 2

Repechage 3

Repechage 4

Final round

Final classification

References

Sabre men
Men's events at the 1988 Summer Olympics